The Sea is a body of water covering most of Earth.

Sea or SEA may also refer to:

Places

Geography
 SEA, an acronym for Southeast Asia
 SEA, an acronym for Southeast Africa
 Sea, Somerset, a hamlet in South Somerset, England

Transportation-industry locations
 Sacramento Executive Airport, California
 Seattle–Tacoma International Airport, Washington (IATA code: SEA)
 King Street Station, Seattle, Washington (Amtrak code: SEA)
 Seaham railway station, County Durham, England (National Rail code: SEA)

People with the name
 Sea Kumada (born 2001), Japanese child actress

Arts, entertainment, and media

Music
 Sea (EP), an EP by Doves
 Sky Eats Airplane, or SEA, a digital metalcore band from Texas
 Streaming equivalent albums, see album-equivalent unit

Radio
 Sea 92FM, a New Zealand radio station
 Sea FM, an Australian radio network

Other uses in arts, entertainment, and media
 Sea (advertisement), an advertising campaign in 2007 to promote Smirnoff vodka
 Svensk exegetisk årsbok (SEÅ), an annual peer-reviewed academic journal of biblical studies and book reviews

Companies and brands
 Sea Ltd, Singaporean internet services company
 Société d'Etudes Aéronautiques, aircraft manufacturers
 Svensk Elektrobil AB, was a Swedish company that made electric vehicles
 System Enhancement Associates, an American software developer, known for ARC file compression

Organizations
 Investigation Bureau for Railway, Funicular and Boat Accidents (Service d'enquête sur les accidents des transports publics)
 Sea Education Association, an ocean science and sailing program
 Scientists and Engineers for America, a pro-science political advocacy group
 Service des essences des armées, French army supply corps
 Sistema Eléctrico de Aysén, a power grid in Chile
 Slovenian Environment Agency
 Socialist Environmental Alliance, a political party in Northern Ireland
 Society for Economic Anthropology
 Southern Economic Association
 Sports & Exhibition Authority of Pittsburgh and Allegheny County
 State education agency
 Swaziland Environment Authority, former name of Eswatini Environment Authority
 Syrian Electronic Army, a group of computer hackers supporting the government of Bashar al-Assad since 2011

Science and technology
 .sea, a StuffIt Expander archive (or application)
 Schoof–Elkies–Atkin algorithm
 Search engine advertising, also referred to as search engine marketing
 Statistical energy analysis
Sustainable Experience Architecture platform, a modular electric vehicle platform developed by Geely
 Mini-SEA (mini-Social cognition & Emotional Assessment), neuropsychological battery

Transportation
 SS Sea, an American steamship

Other uses
 Sea of Suf, a primordial sea in the cosmology of Mandaeism
 Secondary Entrance Assessment
 Single European Act (1986/87), the first major revision of the 1957 Treaty of Rome
 Strategic environmental assessment
 A common abbreviation for the U.S. city of Seattle, Washington and its major professional sports teams:
 Seattle Seahawks, the city's National Football League team
 Seattle Mariners, the city's Major League Baseball team
 Seattle Kraken, the city's National Hockey League team

See also
 List of seas
 Seah (disambiguation)
 Seas (disambiguation)
 See (disambiguation)
 The Sea (disambiguation)